Saint John—Rothesay (formerly Saint John) is a federal electoral district in southern New Brunswick, Canada. With its predecessor ridings, St. John—Albert and Saint John—Lancaster, the area has been represented in the House of Commons of Canada since 1917.

The district has always included the city of Saint John, and various suburbs and bedroom communities have been added or removed from it over the years. Presently the district also includes the town of Rothesay, the Indian reserve of The Brothers 18 and part of Simonds Parish.

The neighbouring ridings are Fundy Royal and New Brunswick Southwest.

History

Originally, Saint John had a special setup for representation in Parliament. The "City of St. John"   returned one member, while the "City and County of St. John", which included the County of Saint John returned one as well. Between 1872 and 1896, the "City and County" riding elected two Members of Parliament. In effect, the city itself had two or even three Members of Parliament. This practice continued until 1914.

After 1914, the counties of Saint John and Albert were joined. The two existing ridings were merged into a new riding, called  "St. John—Albert", that also incorporated parts of King's and Albert riding. The new riding returned two Members of Parliament until 1935.

In 1966, St. John—Albert was abolished when Albert County was moved to the Fundy—Royal riding. A new riding, "Saint John—Lancaster", was created.

Saint John—Lancaster was abolished in the 1976 redistribution, and a new riding with substantially the same boundaries was created and named "Saint John". The City of Lancaster had been amalgamated into Saint John.

In recent years, the Progressive Conservative Party has had the most success in the city: its members were elected in all but four elections since 1953: 1974, 1980, 2004, and 2006. Well-known Members of Parliament from the area include Father of Confederation Samuel Leonard Tilley, former Veterans Affairs Minister Gerald Merrithew and popular former mayor Elsie Wayne.

As per the 2012 federal electoral redistribution, this riding was renamed Saint John—Rothesay and lost a small portion of territory to Fundy Royal.

Members of Parliament
These ridings have elected the following Members of Parliament:

Election results

Saint John—Rothesay, 2013 representation order

Saint John, 2003 Representation Order

Saint John, 1996 Representation Order

Saint John, previous elections

Saint John—Lancaster, 1966–1976

St. John—Albert 1914–1966

Note: Conservative vote is compared to Government vote in 1917 election, and Liberal vote is compared to Opposition vote. Popular vote is compared to the party's total share of the popular vote in the 1917 general election.

See also
 List of Canadian federal electoral districts
 Past Canadian electoral districts

References

Notes

External links
Riding history from the Library of Parliament:
 1914 - 1966
 1966 - 1976
1976-1987
1987-present

New Brunswick federal electoral districts
Politics of Saint John, New Brunswick